Perdaxius, Perdaxus in sardinian language, is a comune (municipality) in the Province of South Sardinia in the Italian region Sardinia, located about  west of Cagliari and about  east of Carbonia.

Perdaxius borders the following municipalities: Carbonia, Narcao, Tratalias, Villaperuccio.

Demographic evolution

References

Cities and towns in Sardinia
1958 establishments in Italy
States and territories established in 1958